Zamora TV is a Venezuelan community television channel.  It was created in August 2004 and can be seen in the community of Villa de Cura in the Zamora Municipality of the Aragua State of Venezuela on UHF channel 61.  Miguel Ortiz is the legal representative of the foundation that owns this channel.

Zamora TV does not have a website.

See also
List of Venezuelan television channels

Television networks in Venezuela
Television stations in Venezuela
Television channels and stations established in 2004
2004 establishments in Venezuela
Television in Venezuela
Spanish-language television stations